Clara or Clara More is a townland and small clachan consisting of a bridge over the Avonmore River and a number of buildings in County Wicklow in Ireland. The village is situated halfway between Laragh and Rathdrum on the R755 road, and is sometimes referred to as the 'smallest village in Ireland'.

The most prominent structures locally include the settlement's narrow six-arch road bridge (built c.1680), and the nearby Clara Vale Catholic church (built c.1799). The church is dedicated to Saint Patrick and Saint Killian and underwent significant renovations in the late 1830s. The local Vale of Clara Nature Reserve is thought to be one of the oldest hardwood forests in Ireland.

References

Towns and villages in County Wicklow
Tourist attractions in County Wicklow